Beginning in the 1950s and through the 1980s, the Polish School of Posters combined the aesthetics of painting and the use of metaphor with the succinctness of the poster. By utilizing characteristics such as painterly gesture, linear quality, and vibrant colors, as well as individual personality, humor, and fantasy, the Polish poster made the distinction between designer and artist less apparent. Posters of the Polish Poster School significantly influenced the international development of graphic design in poster art. Influenced by the vibrant colors of folk art, they combine printed slogans, often hand-lettered, with popular symbols, to create a concise metaphor. As a hybrid of words and images, these posters created a certain aesthetic tension. In addition to aesthetic aspects, these posters revealed the artist's emotional involvement with the subject. They did not solely exist as an objective presentation, rather they were also the artist's interpretation and commentary on the subject and on society.

History 
The Polish School of Posters was an approach to poster design which started during the post-World War II period in Poland from the 1950s continuing through the 1980s. In its early years, the Polish People's Republic (PRL, 1947–1989) was in a phase of rebuilding its cultural institutions. In the post-war economy under bureaucratic censorship and regulation, Polish artists had limited artistic opportunities, but they were able to use the poster as their means of artistic expression and career. Some reasons the poster continued to thrive during this time period were the reopening of cultural venues such as theatres for cinema and performances as well as the state sponsorship of poster making.

Before the Polish School of Posters, during the Stalin era, Socialist Realism was the only sanctioned aesthetic for the fine arts and design in Poland. Not to be confused with Social Realism which also depicted the working class, Socialist Realism in Poland was used solely as propaganda for the communist government. Socialist Realist posters depicted the elevated laborer pursuing the state’s political goals using a strictly realist style. Due to the vetting process for the arts, artists couldn’t exhibit abstract or subjective work, but they were able to use symbolism, metaphor, and allusion to convey their ideas. These visual techniques became characteristic of poster designers of the Polish School of Posters and near the mid 1950s, as Stalin-era repressions loosened and state sponsorship of poster making continued, poster designers gained more artistic freedom.

The title Polish School of Posters was first applied to the Warsaw Academy of Fine Arts in the early 1950s and may have been first used by designer Jan Lenica. In this academy, poster making was given its own category and was seen as an equal to the institution's other artistic disciplines. Often Polish posters of this era were not a super effective forms of advertisement, nor were they necessarily meant to be, rather they were made for the purpose of being works of art. Polish Poster School designers used allusion, symbolism, and metaphor to engage the viewer in interpreting the imagery on their posters. The conceptual imagery was meant to evoke subjective associations in the viewer that were not literally visible on the paper. Many of these posters were witty, humorous, and included fantastical and allegorical elements in their design. Critics experienced difficulty trying to find the common thread between these posters because of their individuality, but they tended to group them by their painterly gesture and linear style and traced their vibrant colors back to folk art.

Global Influence 
Posters of the Polish Poster influenced poster design internationally. One major contribution is in their use of allusion.

Collections
The largest and most complete private collection of Polish posters, dating from 1909 to the modern era, is the Rosenberg Poster Collection. The collection includes posters that were made during political oppression after the Second World War. In this environment of censorship and regulation, artists focused on the poster as a medium to express meaning and add color to the streets of post-war Poland.

The largest state-owned collection of Polish posters is the Poster Museum at Wilanów. It is the world's oldest poster museum, founded in 1968, housed at the Wilanów Palace complex in Warsaw.

Notable Examples 

 1948: Czarny Narcyz by Henryk Tomaszewski. Black Narcissus film poster.
 1948: The Last Stage by Tadeusz Trepkowski. Film poster.
 1952: “Nie!” (“No!”) by Tadeusz Trepkowski. Political poster.
 1962: Ewa Kossakowska. Circus poster.
 1963: Jerzy Srokowski. Circus poster.
 1963: Zawrót Głowy by Roman Cieślewicz. Vertigo film poster.
 1964: Wozzeck by Jan Lenica. Opera Poster.
 1967: Dziewczyna O Zielonych Oczach by Maria Ihnatowicz. Girl with Green Eyes film poster.
 1970: Maciej Urbaniec. Circus poster.
 1972: Kabaret by Wictor Gorka. Cabaret film poster.
 1973: Zbrodniarka Czy Ofiara by Ewa Gargulinska. Kuro no bonryu, Ordinary Darkness film poster.
 1979: Andrzej Pagowski. Circus poster.

Artists
 Roman Cieślewicz
Rafal Olbinski
 Wojciech Fangor
 Mieczyslaw Gorowski
 Tadeusz Jodlowski
 Jan Lenica
Bogusław Lustyk
 Jan Młodożeniec
 Józef Mroszczak
 Franciszek Starowieyski
 Waldemar Świerzy
 Piotr Szyhalski
 Henryk Tomaszewski
 Maciej Urbaniec
 Mieczyslaw Wasilewski
 Jan Sawka
Jerzy Napieracz

Further reading 
Praca Zbiorowa: Encyklopedia sztuki polskiej, hasło "plakat". Kraków: Wydawnictwo Ryszard Kluszczyński, 2002, s. 500–501. .
Praca Zbiorowa: Polska Szkoła Plakatu w latach 1956–1965. Warszawa: Muzeum Plakatu w Wilanowie, Oddz. Muzeum Narodowego w Warszawie, 1988.
Elizabeth E. Guffey: Posters: A Global History. Reaktion Books, 2014. .
Joseph Czestochowski: Contemporary Polish Posters in Full Color, Dover Publications (June 1, 1979)
Jacek Mrowczyk: VeryGraphic. Polish Designets of the 20th Century, Culture PL (February 23, 2016)
 Kempa, Karolina (2018), Polnische Kulturplakate im Sozialismus. Eine kunstsoziologische Untersuchung zur (Be-)Deutung des Werkes von Jan Lenica und Franciszek Starowieyski, Wiesbaden: Springer,

References

External links
The Origins of the Polish School of Posters
6 Legends of the Polish Poster School
18 Most Important Polish Graphic Designers of the 20th Century
The Legacy Of Polish Posters
Classic Polish Film Posters Database

Polish poster artists
Graphic design